The Men's under-23 time trial of the 2021 UCI Road World Championships was a cycling event that took place on 20 September 2021 from Knokke-Heist  to Bruges, Belgium. It was the 25th edition of the event. The race was won by Danish rider Johan Price-Pejtersen, finishing ten seconds ahead of Luke Plapp of Australia.

Final classification
68 riders from 43 nations entered the competition, of which one did not finish and oone did not start.

References

Men's under-23 time trial
UCI Road World Championships – Men's under-23 time trial
2021 in men's road cycling